The Renegade Rip is the student newspaper of Bakersfield College. In publication since 1929, The Rip covers campus news as well as major events off campus. The Renegade Rip won Pacesetter Awards in 2003 and 2008.

References

External links
Official Website

Student newspapers published in California
Publications established in 1929
Bakersfield College
1929 establishments in California